During the 2005–06 season, Betis finished 14th in the La Liga.

Squad

Competitions

La Liga

League table

Copa del Rey

References

Real Betis seasons
Real Betis